Buckhorn Township may refer to the following townships in the United States:

 Buckhorn Township, Brown County, Illinois
 Buckhorn Township, Harnett County, North Carolina
 Buckhorn Township, Wake County, North Carolina